U Pannya Jota Mahathera (Burmese: ဦးပညာဇောတမဟာထေရ်, ; December 22, 1955 – April 13, 2020), locally known as Guru Bhante, was a Bangladeshi Theravada monk. He was born in a Royal Bohmong family at Bandarban, East Pakistan. He served the government of Bangladesh as a judge and magistrate for about eight years prior to becoming a Buddhist monk.

Biography

Early life
U Pannya Jota (Birth name: U Saw Hla) was born in Bandarban, East Pakistan, on December 22, 1955 to father Hla Thowai Prue and mother Aung Mra Ching. His grandfather, Kyaw Zaw Than, was King of Royal Bohmong family.

At the age of six or seven, he began to attend school in Bandarban. After high school and college, he was admitted to Dhaka University in the Law department.

University 

During university, Jota led several organizations in promoting education among the students. He also joined many organizations that worked for the promotion of indigenous cultural heritage. He performed traditional songs at functions and composed many popular Marma songs like “Sangrai ma.”  He also formed a band named The Royal Artists Group. After his graduation, he served the Bangladesh Government as a judge and magistrate for about 8 years. He resigned from his job as a judge and became a Buddhist monk in 1990 at Ching Mrong Bihara. At that time, he changed his name to U Pannya Jota Mahathera.

Life as U Pannya Jota
U Pannya Jota was very keen on learning and practicing Buddhism in depth. He believed Buddhism has the potential to bring peace to the minds of all people. He visited various places and taught Dhamma to the laypeople. He was one of the social reformers who worked on the scientific understanding of Buddhism and denied the superstitions that many in Bangladesh believed. Outside of preaching, he spent most of his free time practicing meditation. He visited various countries and met many meditation teachers such as S.N. Goenka. He learned meditation from many great meditation masters in India and Burma.

Publications
U Pannya Jota was not only a practitioner, but a Buddhist scholar as well, publishing many books on Buddhist topics. His books were highly successful among Bangladeshi Buddhist readers.

Establishment
U Pannya Jota built several temples inside and outside of Bangladesh. These are some of his temples built by him. Some are under construction. 

 Zin Mara Jayi Dhatu Zadi                      | Bandarban, Bangladesh. (Reconstruction, more than 250 years old)
 Khyaungwa Kyaung Raja Vihara (Chief priest)   | Bandarban, Bangladesh.
 Pannya Passanara Buddhist Monastery           | Bandarban, Bangladesh.
 Buddha Dhatu Naundawgree Zadi                 | Bandarban, Bangladesh.
 Maha Shuka Chutongbrae Buddha Dhatu Jadi      | Bandarban, Bangladesh.
 Rama Naundawgree Pagoda                       | Bandarban, Bangladesh.
 Rama Zadi                                     | Bandarban, Bangladesh.
 Bangladesh Buddhist Monastery                 | Yangoon, Myanmar.
 Bangladesh Buddhist Monastery                 | Maung Daw, Arakan State, Myanmar.

 Kyaukmalaung Zadi                             | Bandarban, Bangladesh. (under construction)
 The Holy Jaghat Santi Sukha Zadi              | Chimbuk, Bandarban, Bangladesh. (under construction)
 Buddha Gaya Temple                            | Buddha Gaya , India.(under construction)

Buddha Dhatu Jadi 

One of the most famous temples founded by U Pannya Jota is the Buddha Dhatu Jadi. Also known as the Bandarban Golden Temple, the temple features a golden bell set on a dragon statue along with the second biggest Buddhist statue in Bangladesh. The Buddha's dhatu (relic), which is enshrined in the temple, was a gift given to  U Pannya Jota Mahathera in 1994 by the State Sangha Maha Nayaka Committee of Myanmar. The dhatu of Golden Temple is believed to provide peace and contentment for mankind.

Rama Zadi
Rama Zadi is the largest and tallest Buddhist temple of Bangladesh, which is located in Hoda Babur Ghona area of Rohangchhari Upazila Road, 3 km away from the Bandarban district town. Its height is almost 175 ft.

Participation

U Pannya Jota attended the following conferences in order to promote the exchange of ideas and maintain international connections with Buddhist countries.

 The World Buddhist Summit, Yangon, Myanmar 2004.
 UN Day of Vesak, Bangkok, Thailand, 2007.
 UN Day of Vesak, Hanoi, Vietnam, 2008.
 World Religions Conference, Seoul, 2015.

Social welfare

All of his organizations were for the purpose of social welfare. He built schools and learning centers especially for children and monks. His aim was to educate the young generation of the society because he believed that the future lies in the hands of the youth. Consequently, he thought the cause of tyranny and conflicts in the society is due to education: people with improper education were the ones creating problems in society in his eyes. They would do foolish things because they hadn't been taught otherwise. The most venerable of his aims was to build an educated society by providing secular and religious studies to all.He also hoped that the children in his institutions would be examples and contributors to society. In his documentary, he said that he wanted to provide education for poor children whose parents are not able to pay education fees to send their children to schools. He also mentioned that some of these children are far from remote and hill areas of Chittagong Hill Tracts where there is not access to modern schools and facilities. Listed below are some of his social institutions for children.

 Sasana Vaddhana Pariyatti Kyaung (Religious school)
 Be Happy Learning Centre (Orphanage & Free school)
 Kyaukmalaung Girl Hostel (Orphanage & Free school) (under construction)

References

External links
 
Check in at Buddha Dhatu Jadi and Rama Zadi on Facebook
Dhamma Speech by U Pannya Jota Mahathera on YouTube

1955 births
2020 deaths
Bangladeshi judges
Bangladeshi Buddhists
Theravada Buddhist monks
Bangladeshi Buddhist monks
20th-century Buddhist monks
21st-century Buddhist monks
Bangladeshi scholars of Buddhism
Buddhist pacifists
Theravada Buddhism writers